Laurie Bleeker (born November 30, 1954) is an American former politician who served for one term in the Kansas State Senate as a Republican.

References

1954 births
Living people
Republican Party Kansas state senators
People from Great Bend, Kansas
20th-century American politicians
Women state legislators in Kansas
20th-century American women politicians